A Bitter electromagnet or Bitter solenoid is a type of electromagnet invented in 1933 by American physicist Francis Bitter used in scientific research to create extremely strong magnetic fields. Bitter electromagnets have been used to achieve the strongest continuous manmade magnetic fields on earth―up to 45 teslas, .

Advantages
Bitter electromagnets are used where extremely strong fields are required. The iron cores used in conventional electromagnets saturate, and are limited to fields of about 2 teslas. Superconducting electromagnets can produce stronger magnetic fields but are limited to fields of 10 to 20 teslas, due to flux creep, though theoretical limits are higher. For stronger fields resistive solenoid electromagnets of the Bitter design are used. Their disadvantage is that they require very high drive currents, and dissipate large quantities of heat.

Construction

Bitter magnets are constructed of circular conducting metal plates and insulating spacers stacked in a helical configuration, rather than coils of wire. The current flows in a helical path through the plates. This design was invented in 1933 by American physicist, Francis Bitter. In his honor, the plates are known as Bitter plates. The purpose of the stacked plate design is to withstand the enormous outward mechanical pressure produced by Lorentz forces due to the magnetic field acting on the moving electric charges in the plate, which increase with the square of the magnetic field strength. Additionally, water circulates through holes in the plates as a coolant, to carry away the enormous heat created in the plates due to resistive heating by the large currents flowing through them. The heat dissipation also increases with the square of the magnetic field strength.

In the mid-1990s researchers at the National High Magnetic Field Laboratory (NHMFL) at Florida State University in Tallahassee improved on this basic design and created what they refer to as the Florida Bitter. By elongating the mounting and cooling holes, there is a substantial drop in the stresses developed in the system and an improvement in cooling efficiency. As the stresses increased in the original bitter plates, they would flex slightly causing the small circular cooling holes to move out of alignment reducing the efficacy of the cooling system. The Florida Bitter plates will flex less due to the reduced stresses, and the elongated cooling holes will always be in partial alignment despite any flexure the discs experience. This new design allowed for a 40% increase in efficiency and has become the design of choice for bitter plate based resistive magnets.

Current density and magnetic flux density
Unlike a copper wire, the current density of a current carrying disc is not uniform across its cross-sectional area, but is instead a function of the ratio of the inner diameter of the disc to an arbitrary radius within the disc. The implications of this relationship is that the current density decreases with an increase in radius. As such, the bulk of the current is flowing closer to the inner radius of the disc. Large discs (i.e., disc with a large difference between their inner and outer radius) will have a larger discrepancy in the current density between the inner and outer portions of the disc. This will reduce the efficiency and cause additional complications in the system because there will be a more substantial temperature and stress gradient along the disc. As such, a series of nested coils is often used as it will more evenly distribute the current across a large combined area as opposed to a single coil with large discs.

The non-uniform current density must also be considered when calculating the magnetic flux density. Ampère's Law for a basic current carrying loop of wire gives that the on-axis magnetic flux is proportional to the current running through the wire and is related to the basic geometry of the loop, but is not concerned with the geometry of the cross section of the wire. The current density is uniform across the cross-sectional area of a wire. This is not the case for a Bitter disc. As such, the current term must be replaced with terms discussing the cross-sectional area of the disc and the current density. The equation for the on-axis magnetic flux density of a Bitter disc becomes much more complex as a result.

The differential flux density is related to the current density and the differential area. The introduction of a space factor must be included to compensate for variations in the disc related to cooling and mounting holes.

Record Bitter magnets
 
The strongest continuous magnetic fields on Earth have been produced by Bitter magnets.  the strongest continuous field achieved by a room temperature magnet is 37.5T produced by a Bitter electromagnet at the Radboud University High Field Magnet Laboratory in Nijmegen, Netherlands.

The strongest continuous manmade magnetic field, 45T, was produced by a hybrid device, consisting of a Bitter magnet inside a superconducting magnet. The resistive magnet produces 33.5T and the superconducting coil produces the remaining 11.5T. The former magnet requires 30MW of power, the latter must be kept at  using liquid helium, taking 6 weeks to cool. It costs $1452 per hour to run at full field. In 2019, another partially-superconducting electromagnet achieved the world record for a static DC magnetic field: 45.5T.

See also
Superconducting magnet

References

External links

National High Magnetic Field Laboratory Magnet Projects Page at Florida State University
 Magnets at  Nijmegen High Field Magnet Laboratory 
The Frog That Learned to Fly  and a ball of water inside a Bitter solenoid at the High Field Magnet Laboratory
Diagrams and description  of the Bitter solenoid used in the frog levitation demonstration
 Bitter magnet designs: NHMFL Bitter Magnet and Radbound University Bitter Solenoid

Types of magnets